Chak Jano Kalan is a village and Union council of  Phalia Tehsil, Mandi Bahauddin District, Punjab, Pakistan. Chak Jano Kalan is located at 32°27'0N 73°43'0E with an altitude of 216 metres (711 feet) and lies about 34km South East of Mandi Bahauddin (the district capital) on the Gujrat-Sargodha Road. The nearest police station is Pharianwali Police Station, which is 3 km to the east. Chak Jano is divided into three branches, Chak Jano Kalan, Chak Jano Khurd and Nai Abadi. The combined population of Chak Jano is 15,000. About 40% of the population are farmers, 40% is labour, 15% is overseas, and other 5% is commercial and industrial...

References

Villages in Phalia Tehsil
Villages in Mandi Bahauddin District
Union councils of Mandi Bahauddin District